Grandview, Tennessee may refer to the following places in Tennessee:
Grandview, Greene County, Tennessee
Grandview, Hardin County, Tennessee
Grandview, Knox County, Tennessee
Grandview, Putnam County, Tennessee
Grandview, Rhea County, Tennessee